The 1985 Preakness Stakes was the 110th running of the Preakness Stakes thoroughbred horse race. The race took place on May 18, 1985, and was televised in the United States on the ABC television network. Tank's Prospect, who was jockeyed by Pat Day, won the race by a head over runner-up and favorite Chief's Crown. Approximate post time was 5:41 p.m. Eastern Time. The race was run over a fast track in a final time of 1:53-2/5.  The Maryland Jockey Club reported total attendance of 81,235, this is recorded as second highest on the list of American thoroughbred racing top attended events for North America in 1984.

Payout 

The 110th Preakness Stakes Payout Schedule

$2 Exacta:  (6–3) paid   $24.40

The full chart 

 Winning Breeder: Edward A. Seltzer; (KY)
 Winning Time: 1:53 2/5
 Track Condition: Fast
 Total Attendance: 81,235

See also 

 1985 Kentucky Derby

References

External links 

 

1985
1985 in horse racing
Horse races in Maryland
1985 in American sports
1985 in sports in Maryland